Ďáblice is a municipal district (městská část) and cadastral area (katastrální území) in Prague. It is located in the northern part of the city. As of 2008, there were 3,048 inhabitants living in Ďáblice.

The first written record of Ďáblice is from the 13th century. The village became part of Prague in 1968.

External links 
 Praha-Ďáblice - Official homepage

Districts of Prague